Southwest Sandhill is an unincorporated area and census-designated place (CDP) in Ward County, Texas, United States. It was first listed as a CDP prior to the 2020 census.

It is in the northeast part of the county, bordered to the north by Thorntonville and Monahans. Interstate 20 passes through the northern part of the CDP, leading northeast  to Odessa and west-southwest  to Pecos. Texas State Highway 18 runs along the eastern side of the CDP, leading north through Monahans  to Kermit and south  to Fort Stockton.

Demographics

2020 census

As of the 2020 United States census, there were 1,666 people, 388 households, and 231 families residing in the CDP.

References 

Census-designated places in Ward County, Texas
Census-designated places in Texas